Romina Armellini (born 9 November 1984) is an Italian backstroke swimmer who competed in the 2008 Summer Olympics.

References

1984 births
Living people
Italian female backstroke swimmers
Olympic swimmers of Italy
Swimmers at the 2008 Summer Olympics
21st-century Italian women